Mazi Sou (Greek: Μαζί σου) is the title of the fifth studio album by the popular Greek artist Peggy Zina. It was released on May 9, 2003, and is her first album with Minos EMI. Following the album's platinum certification, it was re-released with three additional tracks, two of which feature Nikos Vertis. Mazi Sou was Zina's first album to achieve a certification after seven years in the music industry.

Track listing

Chart performance

References

2003 albums
Greek-language albums
Peggy Zina albums
Minos EMI albums